Miloš Popović  may refer to:

 Miloš Popović (physician), Serbian physician who was the founder of the Yugoslav Scouting organization
 Miloš Popović (footballer), Montenegrin football player
Milos R. Popvic, Canadian researcher